Taplow railway station serves the village of Taplow in Buckinghamshire, England.

The station has been served by local services operated by the Elizabeth line since December 2019.  Currently, all eastbound trains terminate at Abbey Wood; most westbound services terminate at Reading, with a few peak-time services terminating at Maidenhead.

History

Original station

The first station was opened on 4 June 1838 as Maidenhead (referred to as Maidenhead Riverside in some publications). The station was renamed Maidenhead and Taplow in August 1854. It was constructed of wood, and situated west of the skew bridge that carries the railway over the Bath Road (the modern A4), near .

With the opening of the present  station  miles to the west on 1 November 1871, Maidenhead and Taplow station was renamed Taplow; it was closed less than a year later on 1 September 1872, when a new Taplow station was opened at its current location  mile to the east. As with  station, the actual station is a significant distance south of the village that it takes its name from.

Current station
The current station was opened on 1 September 1872. It was probably designed by GWR architect J. E. Danks, and largely dates from the quadrupling of the line, with dual gauge main line tracks. It is unusually large and grand in appearance, despite the fact it only serves a relatively small number of passengers during the day. The first reason for this was because several major GWR shareholders lived nearby and therefore used the station in Victorian times. The second being that it was always intended to be part of a high-quality network of stations for commuters using the GWR.

During World War II Taplow station played an important part in transporting tanks stored at "the dump" which is now at the site of Slough Trading Estate. The concrete and steel-reinforced road that was laid to take the weight of the tanks can still be found in the station's south car park. Just to the north of the station on a rail siding was a large Barbed wire dump. The siding has long since been removed, the remaining noticeable incline being partially occupied by the nearby SGT car dealership buildings.

The remaining buildings of the station are outwardly little changed since their original construction.

2006 refurbishment
In 2006, the 1884 built station footbridge underwent a major refurbishment costing £250,000. The footbridge was in a very poor state of repair before the work began. This project also included a repaint of the station buildings, partial resurfacing of the island platforms, and renewal of the flower beds. The refurbishment was completed in time for the 2006 World Rowing Championships at Dorney Lake, which used a shuttle bus service to transport spectators to and from the event. During the duration of the event, the station briefly had a Sunday service. The station was heavily used during the London 2012 Olympics, because of the rowing and canoeing events at Dorney Lake.

Crossrail and GWML Modernisation 
Various improvement works have been made at the station, with the refreshment of many station facilities, heated waiting rooms, and a new footbridge with lifts for step-free access.

Facilities

Taplow retains the Victorian era ticket office, with a footbridge linking the platforms. There are four platforms, though platforms 1 and 2 (on the express lines) are gated off and only used in exceptional circumstances. The station is equipped with a ticket vending machine (TVM) and modern customer information screens and has a CCTV monitored car park. It has been modernised in preparation for Elizabeth Line services. Contactless payment pads were added, and a new footbridge with three lifts were installed to provide step-free access to all platforms. The station previously had a bike shelter installed and toilets refurbished by First Great Western. Taplow received 'Secure Station' accreditation from the British Transport Police.

The original footbridge dating from 1884 was removed in totality in mid-2018, and replaced by a second temporary structure. The refurbishment of the lattice footbridge (damaged by railway contractors) appears to have been cancelled; a new modern footbridge with lifts at the London end of the station opened in late 2019.

Services
Since November 2022, nearly all services at the station are operated by the Elizabeth line, with a few early-morning and late-evening GWR services. The station is served by four trains per hour in each direction during weekday peak hours, and four trains per hour at other times.

References

Bibliography 

Railway stations in Buckinghamshire
Former Great Western Railway stations
Railway stations in Great Britain opened in 1872
Great Western Main Line
Railway stations served by the Elizabeth line